Rock Ledge is a historic estate and national historic district located at Rhinebeck, Dutchess County, New York.  The district encompasses five contributing buildings and five contributing structures on an estate developed between about 1904 and 1906.  The manor house is a three-story, Italian Renaissance style stone dwelling.  It consists of a central section with three-story projecting pavilions and a two-story wing.  It has multi-level, tile hipped roofs with overhanging eaves. Also on the property are the contributing stone barn, stone carriage house, a stone stable, guest cottage, three stone pump houses, a stone foot bridge, and a cistern.  It was a private estate until 1945, after which it housed a vegetarian resort, and after 1961 a novitiate for the Marist Fathers and home to Rhinebeck Country School.

It was listed on the National Register of Historic Places in 1989.

References

Historic districts on the National Register of Historic Places in New York (state)
Houses completed in 1906
Buildings and structures in Dutchess County, New York
National Register of Historic Places in Dutchess County, New York
1906 establishments in New York (state)